A myroblyte (from Byzantine Greek , , 'whose relics produce myron'; ; ;) is a Christian saint from whose relics or burial place "an aromatic liquid with healing properties" or "holy water (very much like myrrh)", known as the Oil of Saints, "is said to have flowed, or still flows", or from whose body emanates a scent known as the odor of sanctity. The exudation of the oil or scent itself is referred to as myroblysia (from Greek) or myroblytism. In the Eastern Orthodox Church, some icons are also believed to release the oil.

List of myroblyte saints
 Demetrius of Thessaloniki
 Nilus of Kynouria, d. 1651
 Barbarus the Former Robber
 Simon the Athonite, d. 1287
 Nilus the Myrrh-streamer, d. 1651
 Saint Walpurga: "Famous among the oils of saints is the Oil of Saint Walburga (Walburgis oleum). It flows from the stone slab and the surrounding metal plate on which rest the relics of St. Walburga in her church in Eichstätt in Bavaria. The fluid is caught in a silver cup, placed beneath the slab for that purpose, and is distributed among the faithful in small vials by the Sisters of St. Benedict, to whom the church belongs. A chemical analysis has shown that the fluid contains nothing but the ingredients of water. Though the origin of the fluid is probably due to natural causes, the fact that it came in contact with the relics of the saint justifies the practice of using it as a remedy against diseases of the body and the soul. Mention of the oil of St. Walburga is made as early as the ninth century by her biographer Wolfhard of Herrieden (Acta Sanctorum,  Feb., III, 562-3 and "Mon. Germ. Script., " XV, 535 sq.)."
 Saint Menas: "In 1905-1908, thousands of little flasks with the inscription: EULOGIA TOU AGIOU MENA (Remembrance of St. Menas), or the like were excavated by C.M. Kaufmann at Baumma (Karm Abum) in the desert of Mareotis, in the northern part of the Libyan desert. The present Bumma is the burial place of the Libyan martyr Menas, which during the fifth and perhaps the sixth century was one of the most famous pilgrimage places in the Christian world. The flasks of Saint Menas were well known for a long time to archeologists, and had been found not only in Africa, but also in Spain, Italy, Dalmatia, France, and Russia, whither they had been brought by pilgrims from the shrine of Menas. Until the discoveries of Kaufmann, however, the flasks were supposed to have contained oil from the lamps that burned at the sepulchre of Menas. From various inscriptions on the flasks that were excavated by Kaufmann, it is certain that at least some, if not all, of them contained water from a holy well near the shrine of St. Menas, and were given as remembrances to the pilgrims. The so-called oil of St. Menas was therefore in reality, water from his holy well, which was used as a remedy against bodily and spiritual ailments."
 Saint Nicholas of Myra: "A fluid is said to emanate from the relics of Nicholas of Myra preserved at Bari in Italy since 1087. It is said to have also flowed from his relics when they were still in Myra."
 Apostle John the Evangelist (according to Gregory of Tours);
 Apostle Saint Andrew (according to Gregory of Tours);
 St. Antipas, Bishop of Pergamum, martyred under Emperor Domitian (Acta Sanctorum,  " April, II, 4);"
 St. Babolenus, Abbot of St-Maur-des-Fossés near Paris, d. in the seventh century (Acta Sanctorum,  June, VII, 160);"
 St. Candida the Younger of Naples, d. 586 (Acta Sanctorum,  Sept., II, 230);"
 St. Demetrius of Thessalonica, martyred in 306 or 290 (Acta Sanctorum,  Oct., IV, 73-8);"
 St. Polycarp, bishop of Smyrna, martyred in 156. 
 St. Eligius, Bishop of Noyon, d. 660 or soon after (Surius, De probatis sanctorum historiis, VI, 678);"
 St. Euthymius the Great, abbot in Palestine, d. 473 (Acta Sanctorum,  Jan., II, 687);"
 St. Fantinus, confessor, at Tauriano in Calabria, d. under Constantine the Great (Acta Sanctorum, July, V, 556);"
 St. Felix of Nola, priest, died about 260 (Acta Sanctorum,  Jan., II, 223);"
 St. Franca, Cistercian abbess, d. 1218 (Acta Sanctorum,  April, III, 393-4);"
 St. Glyceria, martyred during the reign of Antoninus Pius (Acta Sanctorum,  May, III, 191);"
 Bl. Gundecar, Bishop of Eichstädt, d. 1075 (Acta Sanctorum,  August, I, 184);"
 St. Humilitas, first abbess of the Vallombrosian Nuns, d. 1310 (Acta Sanctorum,  May, V, 211);"
 St. John the Almsgiver, Patriarch of Alexandria, d. 620 or 616 (Acta Sanctorum,  Jan., III, 130-1);"
 St. John of Beverley, Bishop of York, d. 721 (Acta Sanctorum,  May, II, 192);"
 St. Luke the Younger, surnamed Thaumaturgos, a hermit in Greece, d. 945-6 (Acta Sanctorum,  Feb., II, 99);"
 St. Paphnutius, bishop and martyr in Greece, d. probably in the fourth century (Acta Sanctorum,  April, II, 620);"
 St. Paul, Bishop of Verdun, d. 648 (Acta Sanctorum,  Feb., II, 174);"
 St. Perpetuus, Bishop of Tongres-Utrecht, d. 630 (Acta Sanctorum,  Nov., II, 295);"
 St. Peter González, Dominican, d. 1246 (Acta Sanctorum,  April, II, 393);"
 St. Peter Thaumaturgus, Bishop of Argos, d. about 890 (Acta Sanctorum,  May, I, 432);"
 St. Rolendis, virgin, at Gerpinnes in Belgium, d. in the seventh or eighth century (Acta Sanctorum,  May, III, 243);"
 St. Reverianus, Bishop of Autun, and Companions, martyred about 273 (Acta Sanctorum, June, I, 40-1);"
 St. Sabinus, Bishop of Canosa, d. about 566 (Acta Sanctorum,  Feb., II, 329);"
 St. Sigolena, Abbess of Troclar, d. about 700 (Acta Sanctorum,  July, V, 636);"
 St. Tillo Paulus, a Benedictine monk at Solignac in Gaul, d. 703 (Acta Sanctorum,  Jan., I, 380);"
 St. Venerius, hermit on the Island of Palamaria in the gulf of Genoa, d. in the seventh century (Acta Sanctorum,  Sept., IV, 118);"
 St. William, Archbishop of York, d. 1154 (Acta Sanctorum,  June, II, 140).""

See also
 Odour of sanctity

Notes

References

 
Lists of saints
Christian terminology
Myrrh